Hum To Chale Pardes is a Bollywood family-drama film released in 1988. The film was directed by Ravindra Peepat and written by Anees Bazmee. The musical score was done by Vijay Singh. Starring Rajiv Kapoor, Shashi Kapoor,  Anju Mahendru, Mandakini, Kulbhushan Kharbanda in leading roles, the film explores a father's unfathomable love for his only daughter and the insensitivity of the mother-in-law to the motherless girl. Sharmila Tagore and Asha Parekh had given guest appearance in the film.

Plot 

Kumar and Suman have been married for years but have no children. When Suman is pregnant, has a baby, but is unlikely to survive, she asks Kumar to take care of her daughter and never marry again. After Kumar promises she passes away.

Kumar named the daughter Priya and they share a strong bond between them over the years. When she reaches the marriageable age, Kumar arranges the marriage with her childhood sweetheart, London-based Ajay Mehra. The marriage took place on a condition that Ajay and his mom relocate to India and settle here.

After the marriage, Ajay refused to move to India due to various reasons which create issues between him, Priya and the rest of the family.

Cast

Release and Reception 
The film released on 29 July 1988.

Soundtrack 
The film has six songs, all composed by Vijay Singh and the lyrics penned by Ravindra Peepat. The song Hum To Chale Pardes was a big rage. The other songs were also quite popular.

References

External links 

 

1988 films
1980s Hindi-language films